The 2016 Africa Magic Viewers Choice Awards (AMVCA) was held on March 5, 2016 at the Eko Hotels and Suites in Victoria Island, Lagos, Nigeria. It was hosted by Ikponmwosa Osakioduwa and Minnie Dlamini.

Nominees were revealed on December 11, 2015 by Kenyan journalist Larry Madowo and Nigerian comedian Chigurl.

Awards

References

Entertainment events in Nigeria
2016 in Nigerian cinema
Africa Magic
21st century in Lagos
Africa Magic Viewers' Choice Awards ceremonies